Burujupeta is a locality in  One Town area, Visakhapatnam city. "Burujupeta" comes from "Buruju," a Telugu loan word from Persian and Arabic meaning fort. The temple of Visakhapatnam's goddess deity Sri Kanaka Mahalakshmi is found in the city.

About
The famous Kanaka Maha Lakshmi Temple is located within the city. On the first Thursday of Agrahayana masaam, the area is very busy with devotees of the temple.

References

Neighbourhoods in Visakhapatnam